God Squad may refer to:
Endangered Species Committee
God Squad (comics) - an informal alliance of comic book characters
The God Squad (Telecare) - an American religious television program
God Squad (Global Awakening) - a Christian reality series produced by Christian organization Global Awakening
God Squad - a Belegarth medieval combat-sport team based out of Portland, Oregon.
 Lyons Forum - informal Australian political faction
 God's Squad - Christian motorcycle club